Hans Helmuth Driessnack (August 11, 1927 – October 16, 2006) was a lieutenant general in the USAF, in which he served as a fighter pilot and later, Comptroller of the Air Force.

Background
Driessnack was born in Yonkers, New York in 1927, and graduated from Charles E. Gorton High School in 1945. In 1951, he received a Bachelor of Science degree in civil engineering from Syracuse University, where he was enrolled in the AFROTC.

Military service
After graduating from Syracuse and the AFROTC program, Driessnack was commissioned as a second lieutenant in March, 1951. He served as a base civil engineering officer until October, 1952, at which time he entered the pilot training program at Goodfellow Air Force Base, Texas. In the spring of 1953, having completed combat crew training at what was then Pinecastle Air Force Base (it was later renamed McCoy Air Force Base), Lieutenant Driessnack deployed to South Korea, where he served as a fighter pilot in the 428th Fighter-Bomber Squadron, eventually flying twenty-five combat missions.

In March, 1954, Driessnack was reassigned to the 517th Strategic Fighter Wing at Malstrom, Montana. In March 1954, he was reassigned on-base to the 407th Strategic Fighter Wing.

Lieutenant General Driessnack earned a M.S. in Business Administration in 1959 from the Air Force Institute of Technology.

External links

1927 births
People from Yonkers, New York
United States Air Force generals
Recipients of the Air Medal
Recipients of the Air Force Distinguished Service Medal
Recipients of the Legion of Merit
2006 deaths
Syracuse University alumni